Politics in reorganised present-day Punjab is dominated by mainly three parties – Indian National Congress, Aam Aadmi Party and Shiromani Akali Dal (Badal). Since 1967, Chief Minister of Punjab has been predominantly from Jatt Sikh community despite its 21 percent state population. Exceptions are Giani Zail Singh, the Chief Minister of Punjab from 17 March 1972 to 30 April 1977 belonging to Ramgarhia community that has population of 6 percent and is a part of significant OBC community having population of 31.3 percent in the state and Charanjit Singh Channi who held the position for 111 days from 20 September 2021 to 16 March 2022 and was from Scheduled Caste(Dalit) who have 32 percent population in the state. Other prominent party is Bahujan Samaj Party especially in Doaba region founded by Kanshi Ram of Rupnagar district. In 1992 BSP won 9 seats Vidhan Sabha elections. Also BSP won 3 lok sabha seats from Punjab in 1996 general elections
 and only Garhshanker seat in 1997 Vidhan Sabha elections. Communist parties too have some influence in the Malwa area. In the 2014 general elections, the first-time contesting Aam Aadmi Party got 4 out of 13 seats in Punjab by winning 34 of the total 117 assembly segments, coming second in 7, third in 73 and fourth in the rest 3 segments. The support for the Aam Aadmi Party increased later in Punjab. The current Government was elected in the 2022 Punjab Assembly elections and the AAP won 92 out of 117 Assembly seats with   Bhagwant Mann as the  Chief Minister. The Congress flows down to get only 18 seats.

History

Pre-1947 period

Before 1947 partition of Punjab, politics were dominated by Unionist Party as it was main party in united Punjab especially seen in 1937 elections.

1947–1966

During 1947-1966 Punjab was undivided and consisted of present-day Punjab, Haryana, Himachal Pradesh,
and Chandigarh. This meant that both population and religion factor of whole state was mixed and politics were dominated by Indian National Congress.

Political parties
Punjab has many political parties but only eight parties recognized by Election Commission of India and having presence in the state:
National parties in Punjab 
Indian National Congress 
Bhartiya Janta Party
Bahujan Samaj Party
Communist Party of India (Limited presence in Punjab)
Communist Party of India (Marxist) (Limited presence in Punjab)
Recognized state parties in Punjab 
Aam Aadmi Party   
Shiromani Akali Dal
Other Parties 
Punjab Seva Dal (Beant Singh Bhullar)
Lok Insaaf Party
Shiromani Akali Dal (Sanyukt)
Shiromani Akali Dal (Simranjit Singh Mann)
 Jai Jawan Jai Kisan Party
Revolutionary Marxist Party of India
Alliances in Punjab 
National Democratic Alliance
Punjab Democratic Alliance
United Progressive Alliance

Maps

Punjab in Map of India 
Punjab is situated in Northern India and shares its boundary with three states – Rajasthan, Haryana and Himachal Pradesh and with two Union territories of Jammu and Kashmir and Chandigarh. It also shares its border with Pakistan. 

The election Schedule will declare by Election Commission of India on the reasonable time.

Last year election dates were announced on 4 January and polling was completed on 4 February 2017. Results were declared on 11 March 2017.

Map of Punjab 
Punjab has 23 districts (Malerkotla is the 23rd District, carved out from Sangrur District in May, 2021) and is divided into 4 regions, having 117 total constituencies. 

 Majha region have 4 district and 25 Assembly constituencies
 Doaba is the smallest region with 23 assembly constituencies  and 4 districts
 Malwa is the biggest region with 15 districts (including 3 districts in Puadh region) and 69 assembly constituencies

 34 seats are reserved for Scheduled Castes and Punjab have no reservation for ST community.

Legislative Assembly Seats Map
This year Punjab will see Major Fight between Indian National Congress, Shiromani Akali Dal and Aam Aadmi Party and Punjab Democratic Alliance. 

34 Seats are Reserved for SC's and 83 are unreserved out of 117 assembly Constituencies of Punjab

Region and District wise list of Assembly constituencies

Constituencies
Following is the list of parliamentary constituencies (PC) and assembly constituencies (AC) of Punjab:-

See also
 List of Incumbent Members of Parliament from Punjab, India
 2017 Punjab Legislative Assembly election
 List of constituencies of Punjab Legislative Assembly
 Politics of India
 Punjab, Pakistan
 Punjab, India
 History of the Punjab
 Punjabi people
 Convener of Aam Aadmi Party (Punjab, India)

References

Punjab, India